Ride A Cock Horse is an independently released compilation album by English rock band Queenadreena, sold exclusively through their MySpace profile in 2008. It contains 4-track demos of songs that were intended to be released on their 2000 debut album, Taxidermy. The album takes its name from the nursery rhyme "Ride a cock horse to Banbury Cross".

Release
The album was made available through MySpace, and subsequently released as a limited edition compact disc in Japan by Imperial Records, featuring a bonus DVD of live concert footage.

Track listing

Personnel
KatieJane Garsidevocals
Crispin Grayguitar
Nomi Leonardbass
Pete Howarddrums

References

External links

2008 albums
Queenadreena albums